Callery can refer to:

People
 Joseph-Marie Callery (1810-1862), Italian-French sinologist and naturalist
 Sean Callery, film and television composer
 Simon Callery, artist

Places
 Callery, Pennsylvania
 Callery River, a river of New Zealand.